Vivek Paul (born 1958) is an Indian-American businessman who has been a strategy consultant at Bain, senior executive at GE, CEO of a public company, Wipro, founder of a tech startup that was successfully sold to BMC,  private equity investor at TPG and adjunct professor at Stanford. Ten of his direct reports went on to become public company CEO’s. He has served on multiple community and non-profit boards as well as public company boards.

Early life, education and career 
Paul was born in India and received Bachelor of Engineering degree from Birla Institute of Technology and Science-Pilani and MBA from University of Massachusetts Amherst. He did his schooling from St. Columba's in New Delhi. Paul began his business career at PepsiCo where his outstanding talents were quickly recognized.

GE 
In 1990, Paul was part of the founding team of WiproGE Medical Systems, and became its CEO in 1994. The joint venture started as a sales and service arm, went on to manufacturing, and then design and build of medical equipment, becoming India's largest exporter of high value electronics goods. Paul was then asked to lead GE's worldwide CT scanner business. Paul reorganized operations across its China, Japan and US operations, and launched GE as the first major multi-detector CT provider. The work in complex product development became a foundation of "Design For Six Sigma".. In one of the books about Jack Welch, Paul was cited as among the top 5 All Star CEO's from GE.

Wipro 
In 1999, Paul was asked to become Vice Chairman of Wipro and CEO of its outsourcing unit. Wipro was a $150-million company when Vivek Paul took over, and it had all the tendencies of a small, traditional company. Paul has been credited with creating a global business and for much of Wipro's growth into a multibillion-dollar company. On 19 October 2000, Wipro was listed on the New York Stock Exchange. Paul was recognized as among the top 6 managers in the world by Jack Welch in one of his books, as well as by several business magazines.

TPG Capital 
In June 2005, Paul joined private equity firm, TPG Capital, as an investing partner spanning various fund classes, from buyout to Asia to venture capital. He went on to be a Founding Partner of TPG Growth, a fund focussed on growth capital for midsize companies. He resigned from TPG in December 2008.

Kinetic Glue 
Founded KineticGlue, a cloud based enterprise social media application in 2008. Sold company to BMC in 2013.

Stanford 
Paul co-founded the Microbiome Alliance at Stanford, and was the driving force behind the first Microbiome Symposium at Stanford in 2014. The sixth annual Stanford Microbiome Symposium will be held in September 2021. Paul also co-chaired the Biodesign program of 2014–2015.

Electronic Arts 
Paul served on the board of Electronic Arts from 2005 to 2019, and was Chair of its CEO Selection Committee in 2013.

Paul has served on the advisory council of the Federal Reserve Bank of San Francisco, on the board of the California Chamber of Commerce, on the board of the U.S.-India Business Council, and on the Senate of BITS, Pilani.

Acknowledgments 
 Ranked among the best managers in the world by BusinessWeek in 2003.
 Among the top global business influentials by Time magazine in 2004.
 Among the top 30 most respected global CEOs by Barron's in 2005.

References 

Living people
American people of Indian descent
American businesspeople
21st-century American engineers
Birla Institute of Technology and Science, Pilani alumni
TPG Capital
Private equity and venture capital investors
Isenberg School of Management alumni
St. Columba's School, Delhi alumni
1959 births
Bain & Company employees